The following chronology traces the territorial evolution of the U.S. State of Idaho.

Timeline
Historical territorial claims of Spain in the present State of Idaho:
Gran Cuenca, 1776–1821
Adams-Onis Treaty of 1819
Historical international territory in the present State of Idaho:
Oregon Country, 1818–1846
Anglo-American Convention of 1818
Provisional Government of Oregon (extralegal), 1843–1849
Oregon Treaty of 1846
Historical political divisions of the United States in the present State of Idaho:
Unorganized territory created by the Oregon Treaty, 1846–1848
Territory of Oregon, 1848–1859
State of Deseret (extralegal), 1849–1850
Territory of Washington, 1853–1889
Territory of Idaho, 1863-1890
State of Idaho since 1890

See also
Historical outline of Idaho
History of Idaho
Territorial evolution of the United States
 Territorial evolution of Montana
 Territorial evolution of Nevada
 Territorial evolution of Oregon
 Territorial evolution of Utah
 Territorial evolution of Washington
 Territorial evolution of Wyoming

References

External links
State of Idaho website
Idaho State Historical Society
Idaho History

 
Idaho
Idaho
History of the Northwestern United States
History of the American West
Idaho
Geography of Idaho